Walnut Corner, Arkansas may refer to the following communities:
Walnut Corner, Greene County, Arkansas
Walnut Corner, Phillips County, Arkansas